Lottia fenestrata is a species of sea snail, a true limpet, a marine gastropod mollusk in the family Lottiidae, one of the families of true limpets.

Description

The shell can grow to be 20 mm to 38 mm

Distribution

References

Lottiidae
Gastropods described in 1855